Sarajlu may refer to:
 Sarajlu, Ahar
 Sarajlu, Kaleybar